The Sponge Room is an Australian television film which aired in 1964 on ABC. Produced in Melbourne, it aired in a 50-minute time-slot and was an adaptation of an overseas stage play, written by Willis Hall and Keith Waterhouse.

It is not known if a copy of the television film still exists, given the wiping of the era.

Premise
A married man secretly meets with a woman each week at the natural history museum in London.

Cast
Julia Blake as Hilary  
Terry Norris as Colin  
Neil Curnow as the attendant

Production
The play had been produced on stage in Sydney that year under the direction of Ken Hannam. It had also been performed on ABC radio that year.

It was one of 20 TV plays produced by the ABC in 1964.

Reception
The Sydney Morning Herald praised Barton using "the extremely effective device" of a background of "complete silence from start to  finish".

References

External links
The Sponge Room on IMDb

1964 television films
1964 films
1960s Australian television plays
Australian television films
Australian Broadcasting Corporation original programming
English-language television shows
Black-and-white Australian television shows
Films set in museums